William Hennessy may refer to:

 William Hennessy (violinist), Australian classical violinist
 William Hennessy (wrestler), American wrestler
 William John Hennessy, Irish artist
 William Maunsell Hennessy, Irish official and scholar
 William C. Hennessy, American civil servant and political figure
 Bill Hennessy (Kilkenny hurler) (born 1968)
 Bill Hennessy (Cork hurler) (1882–1954)